Ecocho was a search engine with the aim of offsetting carbon emissions by donating 70% of revenues to 'carbon offset credits'.  The site launched on 14 April 2008.

It is owned by the Found Agency, a search engine optimisation company.

The Ecocho search was powered by Yahoo! after a termination of their account with Google.

For every 1,000 searches, Ecocho claimed that 1 ton of greenhouse gases are offset through the planting of trees. However, the precise amount was not given, nor were the number of searches performed on the site. Rather, the website maintained a tally of trees planted and of kilograms of  offset.

Google violations
On 22 April 2008, Ecocho was informed by Google that they would be denied the use of Google's search technologies for multiple past violations of Google's policies. The issue has been discussed on the Ecocho blog. The mixed reactions from users can be seen in the blog comments, some taking further action by complaining to Google, and others agreeing with Google.

See also
Carbon offset
Global warming
Ecosia
Forestle
List of search engines

References

External links

Carbon finance
Internet search engines